Christopher Hoyer Chueden (born 18 February 1961 in British Columbia) is a Canadian retired soccer player who earned six caps for the national team in 1986, scoring one goal in the process.

In 1979, Chueden was on the Canadian U-20 team at the 1979 FIFA World Youth Championship.

Chueden played three seasons in the North American Soccer League, two with the Montreal Manic and one with the San Diego Sockers.  In 1985, Chueden signed with the Cleveland Force of the Major Indoor Soccer League.  On March 6, 1987, the Force traded Chueden to the Los Angeles Lazers in exchange for Paul Kitson.  He spent one season in the Canadian Soccer League playing for the Edmonton Brick Men. Chueden then returned to the Sockers, who at that point were playing indoor in the MISL. There he played for one season, 1988–1989.

Chueden, together with three other Canadian players (Igor Vrablic, Hector Marinaro and David Norman), was involved in a match fixing betting scandal at the 1986 Merlion Cup tournament in Singapore. He never played for Canada again.

References

External links 

Player profile at FIFA
NASL/MISL/CSL career stats

1961 births
Living people
Soccer people from British Columbia
Association football forwards
Canadian soccer players
Canadian expatriate sportspeople in the United States
Canadian expatriate soccer players
Canada men's international soccer players
Canada men's youth international soccer players
Canadian Soccer League (1987–1992) players
Cleveland Force (original MISL) players
Edmonton Brick Men players
Expatriate soccer players in the United States
Los Angeles Lazers players
Major Indoor Soccer League (1978–1992) players
Montreal Manic players
North American Soccer League (1968–1984) indoor players
North American Soccer League (1968–1984) players
San Diego Sockers (NASL) players
San Diego Sockers (original MISL) players
Sportspeople involved in betting scandals
Association football controversies